Lokomotiv Oslo Fotballklubb is a Norwegian football club based in Oslo. It currently plays in the Norwegian Third Division, the fourth tier of Norwegian football.

History
The club was founded on 26 September 1998. It has played in the Norwegian Third Division since 2014. In 2021, the club finished as runners-up in group 6 of the Third Division, its highest league finish to date. It plays its home matches at Tørteberg Kunstgress.

References

External links
Lokomotiv Oslo FK on Soccerway

Football clubs in Oslo
Association football clubs established in 1999
1999 establishments in Norway